TMF may refer to:

 The Music Factory, an originally Dutch brand of pop music television channels, including:
 TMF Nederland
 TMF Flanders
 TMF Australia, now known as MTV Hits
 TMF (UK & Ireland)
 TMF Group, a Dutch multinational in the accounting industry
 Topological modular forms, an E-infinity ring spectrum used in algebraic topology
 Tour du Massif de Fontainebleau, a hiking trail in northern France
 TeleManagement Forum
 The Motley Fool, an Alexandria, Virginia-based company offering stock-related financial advice and services
 Theoretical and Mathematical Physics, scientific journal
 The Magnetic Fields, an indie pop band led by Stephin Merritt
 Thermo-mechanical fatigue
 Texas Military Forces
 Trey Martinez Fischer, a Texas politician from San Antonio
 Thomas Munson Foundation, a genealogical organization for the descendants of Thomas Volney Munson